Roei Zikri (born 13 October 1992) is an Israeli professional footballer who plays as a forward for Hapoel Petah Tikva.

Club career

Ironi Kiryat Shmona 
Zikri played his debut game for Ironi Kiryat Shmona in February 2012, being substituted on for the last 6 minutes in a 1–1 draw against Hapoel Be'er Sheva in the Israeli Premier League.

Hapoel Petah Tikva 
After being disappointed at only playing two games with Ironi Kiryat Shmona, Zikri signed with Hapoel Petah Tikva for one season, with an option of an extension, in August 2012. In the same month, Zikri made his debut for the club, playing in a 1–1 draw against Hapoel Ra'anana. A week later he scored his debut goal in a 3–2 victory over Maccabi Herzliya.

Beitar Jerusalem 
Zikri signed for four years with Beitar Jerusalem in September 2013. Zikri made his debut for Beitar Jerusalem in October 2013, playing in a 2–0 victory over Hapoel Ramat HaSharon.

Hakoah Amidar Ramat Gan 
On 8 September 2014, Zikri was loaned to Hakoah Amidar Ramat Gan.

References

External links 
 
  Profile page at Hapoel Petah Tikva's site

1992 births
Living people
Israeli footballers
Association football forwards
Beitar Nes Tubruk F.C. players
Hapoel Ironi Kiryat Shmona F.C. players
Hapoel Petah Tikva F.C. players
Beitar Jerusalem F.C. players
Hakoah Maccabi Amidar Ramat Gan F.C. players
Hapoel Rishon LeZion F.C. players
Hapoel Kfar Saba F.C. players
Hapoel Ra'anana A.F.C. players
Hapoel Tel Aviv F.C. players
Hapoel Hadera F.C. players
Israeli Premier League players
Liga Leumit players
Israeli people of Moroccan-Jewish descent
Footballers from Herzliya